The Philippines women's national water polo team represents Philippines in international women's water polo competitions and friendly matches.

Results

Asian Games

Asian Cup

Southeast Asian Games

Betawi Cup International Water Polo Tournament

References

External links
Official Facebook Page

Women's national water polo teams
National water polo teams in Asia
National water polo teams by country
 
Women's national sports teams of the Philippines